The Allied Rapid Reaction Corps (ARRC) is a North Atlantic Treaty Organization High Readiness Force (Land) Headquarters ready for deployment worldwide.

History
The ARRC was created on 1 October 1992 in Bielefeld based on the former I (British) Corps (I (BR) Corps). It was originally created as the rapid reaction corps sized land force of the Reaction Forces Concept that emerged after the end of the Cold War, with a mission to redeploy and reinforce within Allied Command Europe (ACE) and to conduct Petersberg missions out of NATO territory. The first commander, appointed in 1992 was General Sir Jeremy Mackenzie.

From 1994 the ARRC was based in the Rheindahlen Military Complex, Germany. It commanded the Land Forces of NATO's first ever deployment as part of the Implementation Force operation in Bosnia in 1995/6 and was again deployed as the headquarters commanding Land Forces during the Kosovo War in 1999.

In 1997 assigned forces included the 7th Panzer Division; 2nd Greek Mechanised Division; 1st Turkish Mechanised Division (9th Armoured and 28th Mechanised Brigades, plus a third brigade, as assigned); 1st Armored Division; plus other formations, including the 1st and 3rd Divisions, British Army.

Since 2002 however the headquarters has been re-roled (with five other corps HQs of other NATO nations) as a High Readiness Force (Land) HQ (HRF(L)) with a broader mission.  The formation HQ is under Operational Command of Supreme Allied Commander, Europe (SACEUR). The ARRC has a national Force Pool of Combat, Combat Support and Combat Service Support units with which to train and execute its mission. However, in reality COMARRC commands no forces until he receives an Activation Order from SACEUR. On receipt of ACTORD, forces from troop contributing nations, generated through the NATO Force Generation process are passed into his Operational Command for the duration of the operational deployment.

ARRC took command of the International Security Assistance Force in Afghanistan on 4 May 2006 and then relocated from Rheindahlen to Imjin Barracks, outside Gloucester in England, in 2010 before deploying to support the ISAF Joint Command Headquarters in Afghanistan in 2011.

ARRC is also regionally aligned with the European region as part of defence engagement.

Structure 2021
In September 2021 the structure of HQ ARRC was as follows:

 Commander (UK),
 Deputy Commander (Italy),
 Chief of Staff (UK),
 Engineers and Civil Military Integration (UK),
 Training and Security Force Assistance (UK),
 Joint Fires and Influence Branch (UK),
 Operations Division (USA),
 Personnel and Logistics (UK),
 Command Information Systems (UK),
 ARRC Enabling Command (Spain).
 1st Signal Brigade, at Imjin Barracks, Gloucestershire
 104 Theatre Sustainment Brigade, in South Cerney, Gloucestershire

The deployable headquarters infrastructure and communications for HQ ARRC is provided by the 1st Signal Brigade under the Army 2020 concept.

In October 2019, the Italian Division "Acqui", the Danish Division, the 1st Canadian Division, the 3rd (United Kingdom) Division, and the U.S. 4th Infantry Division were assigned to form part of the ARRC if the corps were to be deployed.

In 2021, the United Kingdom's 104 Theatre Sustainment Brigade was transferred under direct control of HQ ARRC.  The United Kingdom's 1st Signal Brigade joined by October 2021.

Troop contributing countries
As of 1 September 2017, the ARRC is composed of service members from 23 NATO troop contributing countries:

Albania
Belgium
Canada
Croatia
Czech Republic
Denmark
Estonia
France
Germany
Greece
Italy
Latvia
Lithuania
Norway
Poland
Portugal
Romania
Spain
Sweden
Netherlands
Turkey
United Kingdom (HQ ARRC's framework country)
United States of America

Recent Commanders

Recent commanders have included:
1992–1994: Lieutenant General Jeremy Mackenzie
1994–1997: Lieutenant General Michael Walker
1997–2000: Lieutenant General Mike Jackson
2000–2002: Lieutenant General Christopher Drewry
2002–2005: Lieutenant General Richard Dannatt
2005–2007: Lieutenant General David Richards
2007–2011: Lieutenant General Richard Shirreff
2011–2013: Lieutenant General James Bucknall
2013–2016: Lieutenant General Timothy Evans
2016–2019: Lieutenant General Tim Radford
2019–2021: Lieutenant General Sir Edward Smyth-Osbourne
2021–Present: Lieutenant-General Nick Borton

References

External links
Official HQ ARRC Site
HQ ARRC British Army website

British field corps
Military units and formations of NATO
Military units and formations established in 1992
NATO Rapid Deployable Corps